Jawali may refer to :-
 Jawali, Maharashtra
 Jawali, Rajasthan
 Jawali, Himachal Pradesh
 Jawali Taluka, Maharashtra 
Jawali Saqawa, atabeg of Mosul